Arianne Hartono (born 21 April 1996) is a Dutch tennis player. 
Hartono has won two singles and fifteen doubles titles on the ITF Circuit. On 12 September 2022, she reached her best singles ranking of world No. 156, and on 11 July 2022, she peaked at No. 123 in the WTA doubles rankings.

College career
Hartono played tennis during her college years for University of Mississippi and won the 2018 NCAA Division I Women's Tennis Championship, becoming the first Dutch player to do so. The same year she won the Honda Sports Award awarded to the top female collegiate tennis player.

Professional career
She made her Grand Slam debut at the 2022 Australian Open.
She repeated the feat qualifying for a second year in a row at the 2023 Australian Open.

Personal life
She is of Indonesian and Chinese descent, and is the niece of Deddy and Lukky Tedjamukti. Her cousin Nadia Ravita is also a tennis player, currently at the University of Kentucky.

Grand Slam performance timelines
Only main-draw results in WTA Tour, Grand Slam tournaments, Fed Cup/Billie Jean King Cup and Olympic Games are included in win–loss records.

Singles
Current after the 2023 Australian Open.

Doubles

ITF finals

Singles: 8 (2 titles, 6 runner–ups)

Doubles: 20 (15 titles, 5 runner–ups)

Notes

References

External links
 
 
 

1996 births
Living people
Dutch female tennis players
Dutch people of Indonesian descent
Dutch people of Chinese descent
Ole Miss Rebels women's tennis players
Sportspeople from Groningen (city)